The 1972 Miami Gatos season was the first and only season of the new team, and the club's sixth season in professional soccer.  It is also the first ever incarnation of the club's new name.  Previously, they were known as the Washington Darts.
This year, the team finished in fourth place in the Southern Division.  They did not make the North American Soccer League playoffs.  At the end of the year the club folded the team, relocated to a new stadium, rebranded themselves, and fielded a new team for the 1973 season called the Miami Toros.

Background

Review

Competitions

NASL regular season

W = Wins, L = Losses, T= Ties, GF = Goals For, GA = Goals Against, PT= point system

6 points for a win, 
3 points for a tie,
0 points for a loss,
1 point for each goal scored up to three per game.

Results summaries

Results by round

Match reports

Statistics

Transfers

See also 
1972 Miami Gatos

References 

1972
Miami Gatos
Miami Gatos
Miami